Arthur Maxwell House,  (August 10, 1926 – October 17, 2013) was a Canadian neurologist and the tenth lieutenant governor of Newfoundland and Labrador.

Born in Glovertown, Newfoundland, he graduated from medical school at Dalhousie University in 1952. He then specialized in neurology, at the Montreal Neurological Institute, becoming the only neurologist, in 1959, in the province until 1966.

In the 1970s, House became pioneer of telehealth by offering telephone consultations with patients in remote areas of the province.

He had helped to establish the medical school at Memorial University of Newfoundland and worked for thirty years there as a professor of neurology. He also held several administrative positions there and he retired in 1993.

In 1997, he was appointed Lieutenant-Governor of Newfoundland and Labrador.

In 1989, he was made a Member of the Order of Canada and was promoted to Officer in 2005.

He died at St. John's in 2013.

References

Biography at Government House The Governorship of Newfoundland and Labrador

1926 births
2013 deaths
Canadian neurologists
Dalhousie University alumni
Lieutenant Governors of Newfoundland and Labrador
Officers of the Order of Canada
21st-century Canadian politicians
Physicians from Newfoundland and Labrador